Metoumou is a commune in the Cercle of Bandigara of the Mopti Region of Mali. The commune contains 22 villages and in the 2009 census had a population of 13,940. The main village (chef-lieu) is Damada.

References

External links
.
.

Communes of Mopti Region